In geometry, a figure is chiral (and said to have chirality) if it is not identical to its mirror image, or, more precisely, if it cannot be mapped to its mirror image by rotations and translations alone. An object that is not chiral is said to be achiral.

A chiral object and its mirror image are said to be enantiomorphs. The word chirality is derived from the Greek  (cheir), the hand, the most familiar chiral object; the word enantiomorph stems from the Greek  (enantios) 'opposite' +  (morphe) 'form'.

Examples

Some chiral three-dimensional objects, such as the helix, can be assigned a right or left handedness, according to the right-hand rule.

Many other familiar objects exhibit the same chiral symmetry of the human body, such as gloves and shoes. Right shoes differ from left shoes only by being mirror images of each other. In contrast thin gloves may not be considered chiral if you can wear them inside-out.

The J, L, S and Z-shaped tetrominoes of the popular video game Tetris also exhibit chirality, but only in a two-dimensional space. Individually they contain no mirror symmetry in the plane.

Chirality and symmetry group
A figure is achiral if and only if its symmetry group contains at least one orientation-reversing isometry. If it is −1 the isometry is orientation-reversing, otherwise it is orientation-preserving.

A general definition of chirality based on group theory exists. It does not refer to any orientation concept: an isometry is direct if and only if it is a product of squares of isometries, and if not, it is an indirect isometry. The resulting chirality definition works in spacetime.

Chirality in two dimensions

In two dimensions, every figure which possesses an axis of symmetry is achiral, and it can be shown that every bounded achiral figure must have an axis of symmetry. (An axis of symmetry of a figure  is a line , such that  is invariant under the mapping , when  is chosen to be the -axis of the coordinate system.) For that reason, a triangle is achiral if it is equilateral or isosceles, and is chiral if it is scalene.

Consider the following pattern:

This figure is chiral, as it is not identical to its mirror image:

But if one prolongs the pattern in both directions to infinity, one receives an (unbounded) achiral figure which has no axis of symmetry. Its symmetry group is a frieze group generated by a single glide reflection.

Chirality in three dimensions

In three dimensions, every figure that possesses a mirror plane of symmetry S1, an inversion center of symmetry S2, or a higher improper rotation (rotoreflection) Sn axis of symmetry is achiral. (A plane of symmetry of a figure  is a plane , such that  is invariant under the mapping , when  is chosen to be the --plane of the coordinate system. A center of symmetry of a figure  is a point , such that  is invariant under the mapping , when  is chosen to be the origin of the coordinate system.) Note, however, that there are achiral figures lacking both plane and center of symmetry. An example is the figure

which is invariant under the orientation reversing isometry  and thus achiral, but it has neither plane nor center of symmetry. The figure

also is achiral as the origin is a center of symmetry, but it lacks a plane of symmetry.

Achiral figures can have a center axis.

Knot theory

A knot is called achiral if it can be continuously deformed into its mirror image, otherwise it is called a chiral knot. For example, the unknot and the figure-eight knot are achiral, whereas the trefoil knot is chiral.

See also
 Chiral polytope
 Chirality (physics)
 Chirality (chemistry)
 Asymmetry
 Skewness
 Vertex algebra

References

Further reading

External links 
Symmetry, Chirality, Symmetry Measures and Chirality Measures: General Definitions
 Chiral Polyhedra by Eric W. Weisstein, The Wolfram Demonstrations Project.
Chiral manifold at the Manifold Atlas.

Knot theory
Polyhedra
Chirality
Topology